Andean Geology (formerly Revista Geológica de Chile) is a peer-reviewed scientific journal published three times per year by the National Geology and Mining Service, Chile's geology and mining agency. The journal covers the field of geology and related earth sciences, primarily on issues that are relevant to South America, Central America, and Antarctica with a particular focus on the Andes. The journal was established in 1974 and articles are published in English and Spanish. The editor-in-chief is Waldo Vivallo (National Geology and Mining Service).

Abstracting and indexing
The journal is abstracted and indexed in:

According to the Journal Citation Reports, the journal has a 2021 impact factor of 2.368.

References

External links 

 

Geology journals
Geology of South America
Geology of Antarctica
Publications established in 1974
Andes
Multilingual journals
Open access journals
Triannual journals
Academic journals published by governments
Academic journals published by non-profit organizations of Chile